Passport Act of 1782 was enacted by the Congress of the Confederation on February 11, 1782. The Act was
recorded in the twenty-second volume of the Journals of the Continental Congress. The passport article was a letter from Thomas Smith of Virginia to George Clymer, Samuel Osgood, and James Madison regarding the nautical trade between tobacco colonies. The Act of Congress states safe passage for the Commonwealth of Virginia traders capitulants seeking to transport tobacco from Yorktown, Virginia to New York.

Passport Act, 1782
- Congress of the Confederation ~ Journals of the Continental Congress, Volume 22 (February 11, 1782)

United States Laws Governing Passports
United States federal statutes establishing authorities, powers, and rulings with regards to passports and sea letters awarded within the United States.

1776-1799 Treaties of Trade with Old World
Colonial America consented to terms with European dominions for respective commerce, maritime trade, and navigation regulations upon the conclusion of the American Revolution. During the cessation of the 18th century, mediterranean basin treaties were settled upon by the North African Barbary Coast and the Iberian Peninsula foreign states.

The multinational protocol documents or treaties endorse the use of passports and sea-letters for state sovereignty identification of merchant ships navigating the seven seas. The safe-conduct permits were allocated in the event of a declaration of war between nations while sequestering manners of dissension and quarrels. The travel dockets governed the full-rigged ship name, bulk and cargo aboard sailing ship, and the identity of commanders or shipmasters including their place of habitation.

1776-1794 European Commerce and Trade Treaties

1795-1799 Mediterranean Amity and Peace Treaties

See also

Articles of Foreign Transit

Maritime Navigation and trade

Origins of Passport

Illustrations

References

Reading Bibliography

External links
 
 
 
 
 
 
 
 
 
 
 
 
 
 
 
 
 

1782 in law
1782 in American law
1782 in the United States
Continental Congress